The Mini-international neuropsychiatric interview (M.I.N.I.) is a short structured clinical interview which enables researchers to make diagnoses of psychiatric disorders according to DSM-IV or ICD-10.  The administration time of the interview is approximately 15 minutes and was designed for epidemiological studies and multicenter clinical trials.

See also 
 Diagnostic classification and rating scales used in psychiatry

References

Mental disorders screening and assessment tools
Medical classification